"Happy to Be with You" is a song co-written by Johnny Cash with June Carter and Merle Kilgore.

Released in October 1965 as a single (Columbia 4-43420, with "Pickin' Time" on the opposite side), it entered the country charts in November, eventually reaching #9 on the U.S. Billboard country chart and #11 on the Cash Box country chart.

Later the song was included on the album Happiness Is You (October 1966).

Background and lyrical analysis

Track listing

Charts

References

External links 
 "Happy to Be with You" on the Johnny Cash official website

Johnny Cash songs
1965 singles
Columbia Records singles
Songs written by Johnny Cash
Songs written by June Carter Cash
Songs written by Merle Kilgore
1965 songs